The Vosges (Franconian and ) are a range of low mountains in Eastern France, near its border with Germany. It runs in a north-northeast direction from the Burgundian Gate (the Belfort–Ronchamp–Lure line) to the Börrstadt Basin (the Winnweiler–Börrstadt–Göllheim line), and forms the western boundary of the Upper Rhine Plain.

Geography 
Geographically, the Vosges Mountains are wholly in France, far above the Col de Saverne separating them from the Palatinate Forest in Germany. The latter area logically continues the same Vosges geologic structure but traditionally receives this different name for historical and political reasons. From 1871 to 1918 the Vosges marked for the most part the border between Germany and France, due to the Franco-Prussian War. The elongated massif is divided south to north into three sections:

 The Higher Vosges or High Vosges (Hautes Vosges), extending in the southern part of the range from Belfort to the river valley of the Bruche. The rounded summits of the Hautes Vosges are called ballons in French, literally "balloons".
 The sandstone Vosges or Middle Vosges, between the Permian Basin of Saint-Die including the Devonian-Dinantian volcanic massif of Schirmeck-Moyenmoutier and the Col de Saverne

In addition, the term "Central Vosges" is used to designate the various lines of summits, especially those above  in elevation. The French department of Vosges is named after the range.

Geology

From a geological point of view, a graben at the beginning of the Paleogene period caused the formation of Alsace and the uplift of the bedrock plates of the Vosges, in eastern France, and those in the Black Forest, in Germany. From a scientific view, the Vosges Mountains are not mountains as such, but rather the western edge of the unfinished Alsatian graben, stretching continuously as part of the larger Tertiary formations. Erosive glacial action was the primary catalyst for development of the highland massif feature.

The Vosges in their southern and central parts are called the Hautes Vosges. These consist of a large Carboniferous mountain eroded just before the Permian Period with gneiss, granites, porphyritic masses or other volcanic intrusions. The north, south and west parts are less eroded by glaciers, and here Vosges Triassic and Permian red sandstone remains are found in large beds.

The Vosges are very similar to the corresponding range of the Black Forest across the Rhine since both lie within the same degrees of latitude, have similar geological formations and are characterized by forests on their lower slopes, above which are open pastures and rounded summits of a rather uniform altitude. Both areas exhibit steeper slopes towards the Rhine and a more gradual descent on the other side. Both the Vosges and the Black Forest were formed by isostatic uplift in response to the opening of the Rhine Graben, a major extensional basin. When such basins form, the thinning of the crust causes uplift immediately adjacent to the basin, decreasing with distance from the basin.  Thus, the highest range of peaks rises immediately adjacent to the basin and increasingly lower mountains rise further from the basin.

Mountains 

The highest mountains and peaks of the Vosges (with Alsatian or German names in brackets) are:
 Grand Ballon (Großer Belchen) 
 Storkenkopf 
 Hohneck 
 Kastelberg 
 Klintzkopf (Klinzkopf) 
 Rothenbachkopf 
 Lauchenkopf 
 Batteriekopf 
 Haut de Falimont 
 Gazon du Faing 
 Rainkopf 
 Gazon du Faîte 
 Ringbuhl (Ringbühl) 
 Soultzereneck (Sulzereneck) 
 Le Tanet (Tanneck) 
 Petit Ballon (Kahler Wasen or Kleiner Belchen) 
 Ballon d'Alsace (Elsässer Belchen) 
 Brézouard 
 Ballon de Servance (highest point in the département of Haute-Saône) 
 Drumont 
 Planche des Belles Filles 
 Molkenrain 
 Champ du Feu (Hochfeld or Firstfeld) 
 Baerenkopf 
 Rocher de Mutzig (Mutzigfelsen) 
 Donon 
 Taennchel (Tännchel) 
 Climont 
 Hartmannswillerkopf (Hartmannsweilerkopf) 
 Chatte Pendue 
 Ungersberg 
 Tête du Coquin 
 Mont Saint-Odile (Odilienberg) 
 Dabo (Dagsburg) 
 Grand Wintersberg (Großer Wintersberg) 
 Hohenbourg (Hohenburg)

Nature parks and protected areas
Two nature parks lie within the Vosges: the Ballons des Vosges Nature Park and the Northern Vosges Regional Nature Park. The Northern Vosges Nature Park and the Palatinate Forest Nature Park on the German side of the border form the cross-border UNESCO-designated Palatinate Forest-North Vosges Biosphere Reserve.

In the late 20th century, a wide area of the massif was included in two protected areas, the Parc naturel régional des Vosges du Nord (established in 1976) and the Parc naturel régional des Ballons des Vosges (established in 1989).

Climate

Meteorologically, as a consequence of the Foehn effect the difference between the eastern and western mean slopes of the range is very marked. The main air streams come generally from the west and southwest, so the Alsatian central plains just under the Hautes-Vosges receive much less water than the south-west front of the Vosges Mountains. The temperature is much lower in the west front of the mountains than in the low plains behind the massif, especially in summer.

The only rivers in Alsace are the Ill coming from south Alsace (or Sundgau), and the Bruche d'Andlau and the Bruche which have as tributaries other, shorter but sometimes powerful streams coming like the last two from the Vosges Mountains. The rivers Moselle, Meurthe and Sarre and their numerous affluents all rise on the Lorraine side.

In the High Moselle and Meurthe basins, moraines, boulders and polished rocks testify to the former existence of glaciers which once covered the top of the Vosges. The mountain lakes caused by the original glacial phenomena are surrounded by pines, beeches and maples, and green meadows provide pasture for large herds of cattle, with views of the Rhine valley, the Black Forest and the distant, snow-covered Swiss mountains.

History

The massif known in Latin as Vosago mons  or Vosego silva, sometimes Vogesus mons, was extended to the vast woods covering the region. Later, German speakers referred to the same region as Vogesen or Wasgenwald.

Over the centuries, settlement population density grew gradually, as was typical for a forested region. Forests were cleared for agriculture, livestock and early industrial factories (such as charcoal works and glassworks) and the water mills used water power. Concentrations of settlement and immigration took place and not only in areas where minerals were found. In the mining area of the Lièpvrette valley, for example, there was an influx of Saxon miners and mining specialists. From time to time, wars, plagues and religious conflicts saw the depopulation of territories – in their wake it was not uncommon for people to be relocated there from other areas.

On the lower heights and buttresses of the main chain on the Alsatian side are numerous castles, generally in ruins, testifying to the importance of this crucial crossroads of Europe, violently contested for centuries. It was used for defence in the Middle Ages and archaeologists are divided as to whether it was built by the Romans, or before their arrival.

During the French Revolutionary Wars, on 13 July 1794, the Vosges were the scene of the Battle of Trippstadt. From 1871 to 1918, they formed the main border line between France and the German Empire. The demarcation line stretched from the Ballon d'Alsace in the south to Mont Donon in the north with the lands east of it being incorporated into Germany as part of Alsace-Lorraine.

The Vosges saw extensive fighting during the world wars. During World War I, there was severe and almost continuous fighting in the mountains. During World War II in October 1944, there was a fierce battle between German forces and the U.S. 442nd Battalion, a segregated unit composed of second-generation Japanese Americans (Nisei), during which the 442nd charged straight up the mountain to rescue the 1st Battalion of the 36th Infantry, formerly the Texas Guard—also known as the "Lost Battalion"—who were cut off and stranded on the mountainside under heavy fire from the Germans.  Two previous rescues failed.  The 442nd suffered 800 casualties, rescued the Texans, and took the mountain.  

On 20 January 1992 Air Inter Flight 148 crashed into the Vosges Mountains while circling to land at Strasbourg International Airport, killing 87 people.

Language

In pre-Roman times, the Vosges was empty of settlements or was colonized and dominated by the Celts. After the Roman era, Alemanni also settled in the east, and Franks in the northwest. Contrary to widespread belief, the main ridge of the Vosges coincided with the historical Roman-Germanic language boundary only in the southern Vosges. Old Romance (Altromanisch) is spoken east of the main ridge: in the valley of the Weiss around Lapoutroie, the valley of Lièpvrette (nowadays also called the Val d'Argent; "Valley of Silver"), parts of the canton of Villé valley (Vallée de Villé) and parts of the Bruche valley (Vallée de la Bruche). By contrast, those parts of the northern Vosges and the whole of the Wasgau, which lie north of the Breusch valley, fall within the Germanic-speaking area because, from Schirmeck the historical linguistic boundary turns to the northwest and runs between Donon and Mutzigfelsen heading for Sarrebourg (Saarburg). The Germanic areas of the Vosges mountains are part of the Alemannic dialect region and cultural area and, in the north, also part of the Frankish dialect region and cultural area. The Romance-speaking areas are traditionally part of the Lorrain language region in the west and the Frainc-Comtou region in the south. For a long time the distribution of languages and dialects basically correlated with the pattern of settlement movements. However, the switch from German to French as the lingua franca which took place between the 17th and the 20th century across the whole of Alsace was not accompanied by any further significant movements of population.

See also
 Northern Vosges Regional Natural Park
 Vosges and Jura coal mining basins

References

Further reading
General texts:

 René Bastien, Histoire de Lorraine, éditions Serpenoise, Metz, 1991, 224 pages.  (simple historic approach for children)
 Etienne Julliard, Atlas et géographie de l'Alsace et de la Lorraine, Flammarion, 1977, 288 pages (a geogropher's view of this part of France who gives theirs waters to Rhin)
 Robert Parisot, Histoire de Lorraine (Meurthe, Meuse, Moselle, Vosges), Tome 1 à 4 et index alphabétique général, Auguste Picard éditeur, Paris, 1924. Anastaltic impression in Belgium by the éditions Culture et Civilisation, Bruxelles, 1978. (large and more sophisticated evenemential history)
 Yves Sell (dir.), L'Alsace et les Vosges, géologie, milieux naturels, flore et faune, La bibliothèque du naturaliste, Delachaux et Niestlé, Lausanne, 1998, 352 pages.  (global view of nature and land)
 Jean-Paul von Eller, Guide géologique Vosges-Alsace, guide régionaux, collection dirigée par Charles Pomerol, 2° édition, Masson, Paris, 1984, 184 pages.  (a precise geologic description)

List of majors periodicals concerning Lorraine and South Lorraine:

 Annales de l'Est (et du Nord), Nancy.
 Annales de la Société d'Émulation des Vosges, Epinal, from 1826.
 Bulletin de la Société Philomatique Vosgienne, Saint-Dié, from 1875 to 1999 (nowadays Mémoire des Vosges Histoire Société Coutumes)
 Publications of the Société d'Histoire et d'Archéologie lorraine, Metz (from 1890, nowadays Les Cahiers Lorrains, trimestrial review).
 Publications of the Société d'Histoire de la Lorraine & Musée Lorrain, Nancy (Lotharingist wrintings since 1820, nowadays trimestrial périodical, Le Pays Lorrain)

On the First World War:

 Guide des sources de la Grande Guerre dans le département des Vosges, Conseil général de Vosges, Epinal, 2008, 296 pages. 
 Isabelle Chave (dir.) avec Magali Delavenne, Jean-Claude Fombaron, Philippe Nivet, Yann Prouillet, La Grande Guerre dans les Vosges : sources et état des lieux, Actes du colloque tenu à Epinal du 4 au 6 septembre 2008, Conseil général des Vosges, 2009, 348 pages. 
 "La guerre aérienne dans les Vosges. 1914–1919", Mémoire des Vosges H.S.C. édité par la Société Philomatique Vosgienne, [hors série n°5, septembre 2009], 68 pages.

External links 

 

 
Biosphere reserves of France
Mountain ranges of Grand Est
Mountain ranges of Bourgogne-Franche-Comté
Horsts (geology)